John Hamann Nunn (born October 12, 1942) is an American rower who competed in two  Olympics. He won a bronze medal in the 1968 Summer Olympics with his partner Bill Maher in the double sculls event. He went on to coach the 1976 Olympic U.S. rowing team in Montreal placing 5th.

He was born in Terre Haute, Indiana. He lives in California and is married and has five children.

References 
 

1942 births
Living people
American male rowers
Rowers at the 1968 Summer Olympics
Olympic bronze medalists for the United States in rowing
Sportspeople from Terre Haute, Indiana
Medalists at the 1968 Summer Olympics
Pan American Games medalists in rowing
Pan American Games silver medalists for the United States
Pan American Games bronze medalists for the United States
Rowers at the 1967 Pan American Games
Rowers at the 1971 Pan American Games